Pravasi Express Awards were introduced in 2013 for appreciating personalities for outstanding contributions to society and endeavours in their chosen field/profession. The awards are overseen by Pravasi Publications from Singapore, publishers of the Pravasi Express Newspaper.

History

The first Pravasi Express Awards were presented on 4 August 2013 in a public function at Spring Auditorium, Singapore with over 400 guests. The Former Chief Minister of Kerala V. S. Achuthanandan was awarded the first Pravasi Express "Life Achievement Award" in the ceremony. The award ceremony was presided over by Ambassador-at-Large Gopinatha Pillai with the presence of Malayalam Lyrist Anil Panachooran and actor Unni Mukundan.

The second edition of Pravasi Express Awards were presented during the third anniversary celebration of Pravasi Express held on 5 July 2014 at Nexus Auditorium, Singapore. The awards ceremony was presided over by Ambassador-at-Large Gopinatha Pillai and singer Jayachandran was awarded the "Life Achievement Award" for his contribution to music. National Award winner Priyamani received the "Youth Icon Award". There were musical performances from Jayachandran, Chandralekha, Ragesh Brahmanandan and Snehaja.

Awards
Pravasi Express awards are given to Indians from different part of the world, to honor their contributions to society and endeavours in their chosen field/profession.  The awards cover different categories including social commitment, business excellence, contribution to Malayalee diaspora, arts and also to appreciate the emerging champions in all the categories.

2020 Awards 
Pravasi Express Awards 2020 were awarded in a virtual event held on 18 July 2020. T.P Sreenivasan, former IFS Official and Ambassador was awarded the Malayalee Ratna Award. He has served as secretary of legation in Tokyo, Thimphu, Moscow. He has also served as a permanent representative of India to the United Nations.
PE Life Time Achievement Award was presented to the renowned dancer, founder and chief mentor / trainer of Baskar's Academy - Mrs Santha Bhaskar for her six-long decade’s significant contribution in the field of music and dance. Young talented actor Tovino Thomas was awarded the Youth icon award and the award event was followed by musical performance from Harish Sivaramakrishnan.

2019 Awards 
Pravasi Express Awards 2019 were awarded in Pravasi Express Nite 2019 held at Shine Auditorium, Singapore with the presence of Ambassador-at-Large Gopinatha Pillai, Dr. V.P. Nair, Pravasi Express Chief Editor Mr.Rajesh Kumar, Chengannur MLA Saji Cheriyan and Singapore Kairali Kala Nilayam secretary Mr.Basil Baby.

Poet and activist Sugathakumari was honored with the Pravasi Express Lifetime Achievement Award for her contribution to Malayalam Literature. Award night was followed by a musical performance from Shahabaz Aman and dance performance by Film actor Arya Rohit. Malayalam comedy actor Ullas Pandalam and team also entertained the guests.
 
Award night also witnessed the inauguration of Singapore Kairali Film Forum (SKFF) by Singapore Film director K. Rajagopal which was followed by the screening of the first micro film from SKFF Godfather.

2018 Awards
Pravasi Express Awards 2018 were awarded in Pravasi Express Nite 2018 held at Kallang Theatre, Singapore with the presence of Mr. Lee Hong Chuang BBM, Advisor Hougang Grassroot Organisation, Ambassador-at-Large Gopinatha Pillai, Pravasi Express Chief Editor Mr.Rajesh Kumar, National Film Award playback singer Ms.Vani Jayaram and Singapore Kairali Kala Nilayam secretary Mr.Basil Baby.

Veteran Playback Singer Vani Jayaram was awarded the Pravasi Express Lifetime Achievement Award for her contribution to Indian film industry and Malayalam film actor Suraj Venjaramood was awarded with Pravasi Express acting Excellence Award for his contribution to Malayalam film industry .
Award night was followed by music from Vani Jayaram and actor Suraj Venjaramood entertained the crowd. Abhijeet Kollam, Vaishnav Girish and Praseeda also sang.

Special Categories
Other honorable award recipients were Jaleela Niaz (PE Special Awards - Excellence in Visual Arts) and Hema Malini (PE Special Awards - Excellence in Art and Culture).

2017 Awards
Pravasi Express Awards 2017 took place in Pravasi Express Nite 2017 held at Holiday Inn, Singapore in the presence of Kerala Minister for Culture and Law Mr. AK Balan, Singapore Indian High Commissioner Mr.Javed Ashraf and Pravasi Express Chief Editor Mr.Rajesh Kumar. Minister Mr. AK Balan presided over the function and also inaugurated the 60th year anniversary celebrations of Kairalee Kala Nilayam, Singapore.
Veteran Film actor Madhu (actor) was honored with the Pravasi Express Lifetime Achievement Award for his contribution to Malayalam film industry and Football Legend IM Vijayan was awarded with Pravasi Express Lifetime Sports Excellence Award.

Special Categories
Other recipients were D Sudheeran (Literary Award), Shanta Rati (Dance Icon of Singapore), Sangeetha Nambiar (Women Empowerment), Deivani (Community engagement), Dr.V P Nair (Health Care), Shilpa Krishnan Shukla (Women Achiever), Arun Sundar (Information Technology), Prajith Manikkoth (Young Achiever), Stephan Samuel (Social Excellence), Mallika Girish Panicher (Performing Arts) and Dr. Anitha Devi Pillai (Research Literature).

2016 Awards
Pravasi Express Awards 2016 were presented by Ambassador-at-Large Gopinatha Pillai in “Pravasi Express Nite-2016” held at Kallang Theatre on 6 August 2016. The event was preceded over by Pravasi Express Editor-in-Chief G Rajesh Kumar and K B Ganesh Kumar, film actor and former Kerala minister was the guest of honour. The award function was followed by music led by G Venugopal and drama by Singapore Kairalee Kala Nilayam, Singapore.

Special Categories
Pravasi Express Awards were also presented to Jayakumar Aravindakshan (retail business), Sreenivas Kurupp (IT Business), Ashok Nair (Sports Excellence) and Gangadharan Kunnon (Community engagement) for work in their respective fields.

2014 Awards
The awards were presented by Ambassador-at-Large Gopinatha Pillai, Actress Priyamani, All Malaysia Malayalee Association president Ravindran Menon and other famous personalities from India and Singapore. The award categories are as follows:

Special Categories
Pravasi Express – Rising Star Award was given to outstanding Malayalee youngster in social, arts, sports or academics category. This award was given to Miss. Anjali George for her performance in contemporary art and creative paintings.

Editorial Excellence Awards
The winners of Pravasi Express – Editorial Excellence Awards 2014 are as follows:

2013 Awards
The awards were presented by Ambassador-at-Large Gopinatha Pillai, lyrist Anil Panachooran, actor Unni Mukundan and many other famous personalities in Singapore. The award categories is as follows:

Special Categories
The award ceremony also witnessed the honoring of two eminent Malayalees in Singapore. 
Shekhari Varma, Maharaja of Palaghat and was a freedom fighter for Indian Independence.
Dominic Puthucheary, founding member of the People Action Party in Singapore and Malayalee who participated in shaping of Singapore.

Pravasi Express – Rising Star Award was given to outstanding Malayalee youngster in social, sports or academics category. This award was given to Vishal Thaniyath, U-16 Football Player in Singapore S.League.

Editorial Excellence Awards
Pravasi Express – Editorial Excellence Awards was introduced to recognize individuals on their contributions in different news arena and the winners were as follows

References

External links
 www.pravasiexpress.com
 PravasiExpress Channel
 Hosting Support : colorvibes
 www.pravasiexpress.in

Singaporean awards
Awards established in 2013
Culture of Indian diaspora
Indian diaspora in Singapore